Senator Maurer may refer to:

John J. Maurer (1922–2019), Wisconsin State Senate
Steve Maurer (born 1947), Ohio State Senate